Chromodoris buchananae is a species of colourful sea slug, a dorid nudibranch, a marine gastropod mollusc in the family Chromodorididae.

Distribution
This species was described from South Solitary Island, Coffs Harbour, New South Wales, Australia. It has only been reported from northern New South Wales.

References

Chromodorididae
Gastropods described in 2000